Alan C. Kamil is an American experimental psychologist.  He is the Director, School of Biological Sciences and George Holmes Professor of Biological Sciences and Psychology at the University of Nebraska, Lincoln.  Kamil's work focusses on the evolution of memory and adaptive specializations of learning in many animal species, especially the Clark's nutcracker and other birds.  Kamil has published  peer reviewed articles on both theoretical aspects of comparative psychology and animal cognition, and on empirical studies of animal learning and memory.  In 2013 Kamil was honoured by the Comparative Cognition Society for his contributions to the study of animal cognition.

External links
 Center For Avian Cognition

References

21st-century American psychologists
Animal cognition writers
Living people
21st-century American biologists
Year of birth missing (living people)